Joseph Stephan Kevin Perticots (born 1 May 1996), commonly known as Kevin Perticots, is a Mauritian international footballer who plays as a midfielder for Mauritian League side Pamplemousses SC and the Mauritius national football team.

International career
Perticots made his senior international debut in a 2–0 COSAFA Cup defeat by Zimbabwe, coming on as a substitute for Christopher Bazerque. He scored his first goal against Madagascar; the third in a 3–1 victory to clinch third place at the 2015 Indian Ocean Island Games. He scored the winning goal in the semifinal at 116 minutes on penalty, helping his team to secure a place in the final of the 2019 Indian Ocean Island Games.

International statistics

International goals
Scores and results list Mauritius' goal tally first.

References

External links
 
 Profile at CAF

1996 births
Living people
Mauritian footballers
Mauritius international footballers
Association football midfielders